St. Mary Basilica, formerly St. Mary's Cathedral, located in Natchez, Mississippi, United States, is a parish church in the Diocese of Jackson and Minor basilica of the Catholic Church.  In 1979 it was listed under its former name as a contributing property in the Natchez On-Top-of-the-Hill Historic District on the National Register of Historic Places. The Basilica was dedicated to Mary, under the title Our Lady of Sorrows on December 25, 1843.

History

The Diocese of Natchez (now the Diocese of Jackson) was erected in 1837, and in 1842 construction began on a new cathedral. 
It was dedicated on December 25, 1843, but the diocese had to wait until 1882 for the building to be completed, forty years after construction commenced. The building was consecrated on September 19, 1886, and remained the cathedral of the diocese until 1977. It was designated a minor basilica on September 8, 1998, and dedicated as such on September 25, 1999.

In 2007 the body of Bishop John J. Chanche, S.S. the first Catholic bishop of Mississippi, was exhumed from a Baltimore, Maryland catholic cemetery and returned to Natchez to be reinterred in St. Mary Basilica's church yard.

Architecture
Our Lady of Sorrows was designed by Baltimore architect Robert Cary Long Jr.; the supervising architect was James Hardie. It is similar to Long's contemporary Church of St. Alphonsus in Baltimore. 
The brick structure is two stories in height, and it was constructed on a partially raised basement.  It features a semi-circular apsidal end, ornamental pinnacles, and buttresses.  The central square tower that is capped with a spire is embedded into the structure, and it has a recessed Gothic-arched entrance. The tower is topped with pinnacles.

Original organ is H. Pilcher and Sons dating to 1882. The Basilica underwent some restoration after sustaining damage in a tornado.

See also
List of Catholic cathedrals in the United States
List of cathedrals in the United States

References

External links
 St. Mary Basilica website
 St. Mary Basilica Archives website
 Natchez of the Mighty Mississippi River

Roman Catholic cathedrals in Mississippi
Mary, Natchez
Mary, Natchez
Roman Catholic churches completed in 1843
19th-century Roman Catholic church buildings in the United States
1843 establishments in Mississippi
Historic district contributing properties in Mississippi
Churches in Natchez, Mississippi